Carex aphanolepis is a tussock-forming species of perennial sedge in the family Cyperaceae. It is native to eastern parts of Asia.

See also
List of Carex species

References

aphanolepis
Taxa named by Adrien René Franchet
Taxa named by Ludovic Savatier
Plants described in 1878
Flora of Japan
Flora of Vietnam
Flora of Korea
Flora of China
Flora of Primorsky Krai